In the Shadow of Saddam is the first novel by Mikhael Ramadan. The book is a collection of memories. Ramadan, who claims to be an Iraqi defector and former Saddam Hussein body double, asserts that in 1997, Hussein ordered development of "a highly virulent strain of West Nile virus as bioterrorist weapon" capable of killing 97 percent of the population in an urban environment.

References

1999 novels
Saddam Hussein